The Fighting Guide is a 1922 American silent Western film directed by William Duncan and starring Duncan, Edith Johnson and Harry Lonsdale.

Cast
 William Duncan as Ned Lightning
 Edith Johnson as Ethel MacDonald
 Harry Lonsdale as Lord Chumleigh Winston
 William McCall as Tubbs
 Sidney D'Albrook as Grant Knowles
 Charles Dudley as John MacDonald
 Fred DeSilva as Indian Bill
 Dorothy Vernon as Mrs Carmody

References

Bibliography
 Robert B. Connelly. The Silents: Silent Feature Films, 1910-36, Volume 40, Issue 2. December Press, 1998.

External links
 

1922 films
1922 Western (genre) films
American black-and-white films
Vitagraph Studios films
Films directed by William Duncan
Silent American Western (genre) films
1920s English-language films
1920s American films